Jeem or JEEM may refer to:

 Arabic letter ǧīm ﺝ
 Jeem TV formerly Al Jazeera Children's Channel 
Journal of Environmental Economics and Management
Journal of Embryology and Experimental Morphology